Chaetocerotaceae is a diatom family (Bacillariophyta). This family comprise the three genera Attheya T. West, Bacteriastrum Shadbolt and Chaetoceros Ehrenberg. Chaetoceros is perhaps the largest and most species rich genus of marine planktonic diatoms. The taxonomic status within Chaetocerotaceae at present is somewhat unclear.

Description
The cells have valves with long setae. Cells are often in unseparable chains, but may appear as solitary cells in some species. Chains are formed by fusion of silica between the setae. Endogenous resting spores are common and very different from normal vegetative cells.

References

Coscinodiscophyceae
Diatom families